The Alumni Arena is a 4,000 seat multi-purpose arena in Savannah, Georgia, United States.  It was built in 1995.  It was the home of the Armstrong State University Pirates basketball teams until the Armstrong athletics program was discontinued following the university's consolidation with Georgia Southern University in 2017.

References

College basketball venues in the United States
Basketball venues in Georgia (U.S. state)
1995 establishments in Georgia (U.S. state)
Sports venues completed in 1995